Drepanulatrix secundaria is a species of moth in the family Geometridae first described by William Barnes and James Halliday McDunnough in 1916. It is found in North America.

The MONA or Hodges number for Drepanulatrix secundaria is 6690.

References

Further reading

 

Caberini
Articles created by Qbugbot
Moths described in 1916